BloodRayne: The Third Reich is a 2011 direct-to-DVD action-adventure horror film written by Michael Nachoff and directed by Uwe Boll, and starring Natassia Malthe as dhamphir Agent Rayne and Michael Paré as vampire Nazi officer Ekart Brand. Set in 1943 Europe during World War II, it is the third and final installment of the BloodRayne film trilogy, based on the video game series of the same name. It is a sequel to BloodRayne and BloodRayne 2: Deliverance, also directed by Boll. It is the second BloodRayne film to star Malthe after BloodRayne 2: Deliverance. Paré, who played Iancu in BloodRayne and Pat Garrett in BloodRayne 2: Deliverance, plays yet another character in this film. BloodRayne: The Third Reich received negative reviews.

Plot 

Agent Rayne fights against the Nazis in Europe during World War II with the French resistance, encountering Commander Ekart Brand, a Nazi leader whose goal is to inject Adolf Hitler with Rayne's blood in an attempt to transform him into an all-powerful dhampir and attain immortality.

The film opens with train cars full of humans heading to concentration camps when a French resistance group intercepts them. Soon, Rayne arrives and kills most of the Nazi troops and corners their commander in a train car. As the two talk, a Nazi shoots Rayne, splashing her blood on the commander's face. Rayne kills the soldier before impaling the commander on a pole and leaving him to die. Rayne soon converses with the leader of the resistance, Nathaniel Gregor, who is aware that Rayne is a dhampir. After finding the train cars full of prisoners, the resistance and Rayne decide to work together to fight the Nazis. After they leave, however, the commander is revealed to have survived his presumed death due to some of Rayne's blood getting in his mouth, implying that he is a dhampir.

Back at the headquarters of the Third Reich, a scientist named Dr. Wolfgang Mangler is torturing vampires to study them so he can make Adolf Hitler and the Third Reich immortal. A Third Reich Lieutenant Kaspar Jaeger informs the doctor that the commander was attacked by a "vampire" in the daytime, intriguing his interest.

Elsewhere, Rayne heads to a brothel to get a massage when she overhears a soldier beating on one of the women. Angered by the beating interrupting her massage, Rayne easily beats the man down, forcing the brothel owner to close early, despite being warned that the Nazis would suspect something is wrong. She ignores the warning and angrily tells Rayne that she better not be a problem for her business. Rayne scoffs at the woman before walking off. As Rayne prepares to leave, a voluptuous woman stops Rayne and thanks her for saving the woman from before, taking off Rayne's robe. Another woman lights several candles as the woman continues to hit on Rayne. The woman walks out, telling Rayne and the busty woman to "have fun." Initially refusing her advances at first, the woman finally manages to seduce Rayne and has sex with her. As the woman sexually dominates Rayne, one of the women listens to their intercourse, smiling mischievously before walking out of the brothel. Rayne continues to have sex with the woman, finally climaxing as she kisses down Rayne's body.

The woman that listened to Rayne's love session tells the commander about Rayne assaulting the soldier from earlier in exchange for running the brothel she works at since she hates the woman currently running it. The commander flirts with the woman, commenting on her beauty before biting her.

Back at the brothel, Rayne is fully dressed, as Nazi soldiers have arrived to kill Rayne. After cutting them down with her swords, she is reunited with the commander. Horrified to learn that she sired a Nazi commander, she flees. The Nazis fire at Rayne, managing to hit her, though she brushes it off and escapes. This angers the commander, as he wants her alive. Dr. Mangler rushes to where Rayne was shot and collects her blood for more research.

Rayne gathers with Nathaniel by asking him for weapons, and dynamite but he refuses. Rayne and Nathaniel go to look for Magda Markovic in a bar, and she gives them some codes. Upon leaving, Rayne fights two vampires and kills them. Rayne has a nightmare about fighting Hitler, who is now a dhampir after biting her. The commander talks to his lieutenant Jaeger and bites him. Nathaniel and Rayne find Basil. Hearing the Director is going to Berlin to create an army of vampires, the lieutenant Jaeger attacks them after Rayne killed him.

The resistance fights the soldiers, but they capture Magda, and the Director tortures her by biting her. The resistance discovers that their hiding place was attacked upon learning that it was a distraction. Rayne attacks and kills soldiers. She and the resistance find Magda, but she is a vampire, and Rayne kills her. Then, the resistance escapes when attacked by vampire soldiers, but Nathaniel and Rayne are taken prisoner, where Mangler draws Rayne's blood.

Being transported in a truck to Berlin, Nathaniel takes care of Rayne, and they have sex. The resistance puts dynamite in the way to rescue Rayne and Nathaniel. The commander drinks Rayne's blood in the fight, and Mangler escapes, but resistance sniper Natalia kills him. Finally, Rayne kills the commander, but she knows there is more work. In Berlin, Rayne, Nathaniel, and the resistance arrive at another Nazi base, surprising them.

Cast 
 Natassia Malthe as Rayne
 Michael Paré as Commander Ekart Brand
 Brendan Fletcher as Nathaniel Gregor
 Clint Howard as Dr. Wolfgang Mangler, Based On The Nazi Doctor Josef Mengele
 Willam Belli as Vasyl Tishenko
 Natalia Guslistaya as Natalia, The Sniper
 Annett Culp as Magda Marković
 Steffen Mennekes as Lieutenant Kaspar Jaeger
 Arved Birnbaum as Director
 Safiya Kaygin as Svetlana Koerk
 Nik Goldman as The Bartender
 Vjekoslav Katusin as German Soldier
 Goran Manić as Boris
 Fabrice Colson as Partisan
 Petar Benčić as Driver
 Boris Bakal as Adolf Hitler

Production 
Boll has originally planned to begin filming in Croatia in 2008 under the title BloodRayne 3: Warhammer, but it was later announced that filming would begin January 2010. The title was changed to BloodRayne: The Third Reich and shooting began in Zagreb, Croatia with Natassia Malthe and Michael Paré in the lead roles. Some speculation has it that a tie-in to the video game Nocturne is present through the character Svetlana who is a rumored vampire in a video post on YouTube.

Michael Paré has appeared in all three films in the BloodRayne franchise, but as different characters; Iancu, Pat Garrett and, Commandant Ekart Brand respectively.

Reception
Like the previous BloodRayne films, BloodRayne: The Third Reich received mostly negative reviews from critics. Main criticisms were towards the acting, script and Boll's direction.

See also
Vampire film

References

External links 
 
 

2011 films
American action horror films
BloodRayne films
Canadian action horror films
German action horror films
2010s English-language films
English-language Canadian films
English-language German films
2010s action horror films
Direct-to-video horror films
Live-action films based on video games
Films directed by Uwe Boll
Films set in Europe
Films shot in Croatia
Direct-to-video sequel films
American vampire films
Brightlight Pictures films
American World War II films
German World War II films
Films about Nazi Germany
Films about the French Resistance
2010s American films
2010s Canadian films
2010s German films